Afghanistan participated in the 1974 Asian Games held in Tehran, Iran from 1 to 16 September 1974. Athletes from Afghanistan won only one medal and finished 19th in a medal table.

References

Nations at the 1974 Asian Games
1974
1974 in Afghan sport